A Resident of the British Empire was a government official required to take up permanent residence in another country. A representative of his government, he officially had diplomatic functions which are often seen as a form of indirect rule. From 1802 to 1923 there were twenty British residents in Nepal who directly or indirectly played a significant role in the Nepalese politics. The establishment of the British Residency in Nepal is seen as a direct effect of the eighth point of the Sugauli Treaty between the Kingdom of Nepal and the East India Company in 1816. The title of Resident was officially changed to Envoy after the Nepal–Britain Treaty of 1923.

For British representatives in Nepal since 1924, see: List of ambassadors of the United Kingdom to Nepal.

List of Residents

See also
Brian Houghton Hodgson
Henry Montgomery Lawrence
Sugauli Treaty
British ambassadors to Nepal since 1923

References

External links
List of British Resident Ministers in Nepal
British Residents of Nepal

Residents
British resident ministers